Svante Nilsson (  1460 – 2 January 1512) was a Swedish nobleman  and regent of Sweden from 1504 – 2 January 1512. He was the father of  Sten Sture the Younger (1493–1520) who later served as regent of Sweden, during the era of the Kalmar Union.

Biography
Svante was born at Penningby Castle (Penningby slott), at Norrtälje in Uppland, the son of Nils Bosson Sture (ca 1426-1494). Nils belonged to the  Natt och Dag dynasty, but took the surname Sture from his maternal grandfather . Svante himself never himself used the surname Sture, but his son Sten later adopted it in order to associate himself with the memory of Sten Sture the Elder (who, confusingly, was unrelated to Sven Sture but was nevertheless a distant cousin of Svante's through the Natt och Dag line). Svante's mother was Birgitta Tordsdotter Bonde (1439-1494), a member of the Bonde family and cousin of King Karl VIII. 

Svante became a member of the Privy Council of Sweden no later than 1482, but acted in opposition to his distant kinsman Sten Sture the Elder, going as far as supporting King John of Denmark. Unwillingly he then switched sides and supported Sten Sture in overthrowing the king.
When Sten Sture died in 1503, Svante became head of state in January 1504.  His resignation was demanded by the Privy Council of Sweden in the summer of 1511, on the grounds that he had neglected the defense on the occasion of  Danish ravages. In practice he remained in power until his death at Arboga on 2 January 1512. Svante Nilsson was buried in Västerås Cathedral.

His first marriage in 1486 was with Iliana Gisladotter Gädda. Through this marriage he was the father of future statesman and regent of Sweden, Sten Sture the Younger (1493–1520). He married a second time in 1504 with Mette Dyre (c. 1465-before 1533).

References

Other sources
 

1460 births
1512 deaths
16th-century viceregal rulers
People from Uppland
Swedish nobility
Regents of Sweden
Rulers of Finland
15th-century Swedish people
16th-century Swedish politicians